Gracias (Thanks) is the title of the studio album released by Mexican singer José José in 1981. The main hits of the album were: "Gracias", "Una noche de amor", "Sólo tú y yo" (Grover Washington, Jr.'s "Just the Two of Us"), "Preso", "Vamos a darnos tiempo" and "Me basta".

Track listing

Notes

1981 albums
José José albums
Spanish-language albums